Mogens Rasmussen (born 18 January 1953) is a Danish rower. He competed in the men's coxless pair event at the 1976 Summer Olympics.

References

1953 births
Living people
Danish male rowers
Olympic rowers of Denmark
Rowers at the 1976 Summer Olympics
Place of birth missing (living people)